ArtSound FM (callsign 1ART) is a community radio station broadcasting to Canberra from studios in the suburb of Manuka. Its format is fine music and arts programming.

ArtSound was established in the early 1980s under the name Canberra Stereo Public Radio.  It is a volunteer run organisation and is listener funded with support from the ACT Government and the Community Broadcasting Foundation.

ArtSound is a member of the Community Broadcasting Association of Australia and the Australian Fine Music Network.
The station also operates ArtSound Audio Services with production/recording studios providing facilities for audio recording, CD duplication and archiving.

Programming

ArtSound music content is Jazz, Classical, Blues, Folk and World music.  It also broadcasts programs on literature, theatre, film, spoken word, art exhibitions and local concerts. Part of its commitment to supporting the Canberra arts community is a schedule of arts-related news and information programs. Also it supports local jazz, classical, blues and folk musicians with live performance broadcasts.

See also	
 List of radio stations in Australia

References

External links

Radio stations in Canberra
Community radio stations in Australia
Radio stations established in 2000
Classical music radio stations in Australia
2000 establishments in Australia